Patrick O'Loughran (in Irish: Pádraig Ó Lochráin) (died 1 February 1612) was a priest of the archdiocese of Armagh and an Irish Catholic Martyr.

O'Loughran was born in Donaghmore, County Tyrone to an Erenagh family. He later became chaplain to Hugh O'Neill, Earl of Tyrone. He left Ireland for Flanders to pursue his education some time before the Flight of the Earls in September 1607. He administered the sacraments to exiled Irish noblemen who had fled to Belgium, and served as chaplain to Catherine O'Neill, Countess of Tyrone. He also attended the Irish College, Douai, where he met O'Neill and traveled with him to Rome.

O'Loughran returned to Ireland in June 1611 and was arrested upon landing in Cork. Under interrogation, O'Loughran admitted that he had given sacraments to the exiled noblemen, and that he had assisted the Irish bishop, Blessed Conor O'Devany. Upon his confession he was committed to  a dungeon and in January 1612, he and Bishop O'Devany were condemned to death. O'Loughran's closeness to Tyrone appears to have been the reason behind the government's decision to single him out.

On 1 February 1612, they were brought from Dublin Castle to George's Hill. The bishop asked to die last so that he could provide Father O'Loughran moral support in his moments before death, but the request was refused. Father O'Loughran replied: "Aid me by your prayers with God, by whose help I am sure that neither death, nor life, nor principalities, nor powers, nor things present, nor things to come, nor anything else, will separate me from the love of Christ or from my companionship with you." Bishop O'Devany knelt to pray for O'Loughran before they were both drawn and quartered. Their bravery and faith
inspired the crowd to surge forward to acquire relics.

The remains were buried on George's Hill but disinterred the following night and given honourable burial. They were buried ‘with other martyrs’ in St James's graveyard. O'Loughran and O'Devany were beatified in 1992 as part of the Irish Catholic Martyrs. The Archdiocese of Armagh marked the 400th Anniversary of the Death of Blessed Patrick O’Loughran with a Mass at Blessed Patrick O’Loughran Primary School, Castlecaulfield.

References

Year of birth missing
1612 deaths
Irish beatified people
17th-century Irish Roman Catholic priests
Martyred Roman Catholic priests
People from County Tyrone
People executed by Ireland by hanging, drawing and quartering
People executed by the Kingdom of Ireland
Executed Irish people
16th-century Irish Roman Catholic priests
17th-century Roman Catholic martyrs
17th-century venerated Christians
People of Elizabethan Ireland
Beatifications by Pope John Paul II
24 Irish Catholic Martyrs